"9 Crimes" is the first single from the album 9 by Damien Rice. This song has additional vocals from Lisa Hannigan as do the rest of the songs on the album. The 7" single is pressed on clear-colored vinyl and has with a fold-out poster.

Music video
The single's video was directed by Jamie Thraves and is reminiscent of the classic short film, The Red Balloon.

Track listing
7" vinyl
 "9 Crimes" - 3:39
 "The Rat Within the Grain" - 2:53

Appearances in other media
"9 Crimes" was used in the 2014 Tubi documentary Our Lives: Extraordinary People, Season 1, Episode 9-Mum, Heroin, and Me.
"9 Crimes" was used during the episode "From a Whisper to a Scream" on the ABC medical drama Grey's Anatomy.
"9 Crimes" was used at the end of fourth episode of season two of the American television series Jericho.
"9 Crimes" was played during the obsequies of German goalkeeper Robert Enke (Hannover 96).
"9 Crimes" was sampled in the Weerd Science track "Infinity".
"9 Crimes" was used in a scene in Shrek the Third, but was not included on the official soundtrack.
The original demo of "9 Crimes" by Damien Rice was used in an episode of True Blood called "9 Crimes".
The song was used in two scenes in the German crime series Leipzig Homicide, episode "Klarer Kopf"
The song was covered by Tyler Joseph of Twenty One Pilots for BBC Radio 1's Live Lounge on 2 November 2018.
"9 Crimes" was used during the final episode of  I'll Be Gone in the Dark (TV series).
"9 Crimes" was used during the audition performance of dance duo Twice on the fifth season of Belgium's Got Talent.
"9 crimes" was covered by Isle of Mann musical artist Katherine Crowe in her 2009 album Unbreakable.

Charts

Certifications

References

Damien Rice songs
Lisa Hannigan songs
2006 singles
14th Floor Records singles
2006 songs
Songs written by Damien Rice